Welcome Home is the seventh studio album by British Afro rock band Osibisa released in 1975 by Island Records ILPS 9355. Issued in 1997 CD format by Red Steel Music Ltd. RMC 0208.

Track listing

Charts

Personnel
 Teddy Osei – African drums, flute, percussion, tenor and soprano saxophones, vocals
 Mac Tontoh – trumpet, flugelhorn, percussion, didjeridu, prensa
 Sol Amarfio – drums, percussion, bells, bongos, congas
 Kofi Ayivor - congas, percussion
 Kiki Gyan – clavinet, keyboards, organ, piano, vocals
 Mike Odumusu – bass guitar, vocals
 Wendell Richardson – guitar, acoustic guitar, lead vocals
 Ray Allen – vibraphone
 Robert Bailey – vibraphone
 Barbara Thompson – vibraphone
 Jean-Karl Dikoto Mandengue – bass guitar on "Uhuru"
 Paul Golly – rhythm guitars on "Uhuru"
 Producer – Gerry Bron
 Engineer – Ashley Howe
 Recorded at the Roundhouse Recording Studios, London
 Cover painting – Ian Emes

References

 All information gathered from liner notes of CD format Welcome Home (Copyright © 1997 Red Steel Music Ltd. RMC CD 0208.)
 Allmusic 
 Discogs 

1975 albums
Osibisa albums
Albums produced by Gerry Bron
Bronze Records albums
Island Records albums